Shing Chung Chan is a paralympic athlete from Hong Kong competing mainly in category C8 sprint events.

Chan competed in four Paralympics, winning five medals, four of them in relay events.  His first games were in 1988 where he competed in the 200m and long jump and won a bronze medal in the 4 × 100 m relay.  The 1992 Summer Paralympics saw Chan win a silver medal in the 100m individual event and raced in the 4 × 100 m relay.  The 1996 Summer Paralympics led to Chan's only gold medal and a world record as part of the Hong Kong 4 × 100 m relay team, he again also raced in the 100m and 200m.  His final games in 2000 saw him win 2 bronze medals as part of the Hong Kong 4 × 100 m and 4 × 400 m teams as well as racing in the 100m.

References

External links
 

Year of birth missing (living people)
Living people
Hong Kong male sprinters
Paralympic athletes of Hong Kong
Paralympic gold medalists for Hong Kong
Paralympic silver medalists for Hong Kong
Paralympic bronze medalists for Hong Kong
Paralympic medalists in athletics (track and field)
Athletes (track and field) at the 1988 Summer Paralympics
Athletes (track and field) at the 1992 Summer Paralympics
Athletes (track and field) at the 1996 Summer Paralympics
Athletes (track and field) at the 2000 Summer Paralympics
Medalists at the 1988 Summer Paralympics
Medalists at the 1992 Summer Paralympics
Medalists at the 1996 Summer Paralympics
Medalists at the 2000 Summer Paralympics